Paul A. Shapiro is director of the United States Holocaust Memorial Museum's Center for Advanced Holocaust Studies. In 2010, he was presented with the Cross of the Order of Merit by the German Ambassador to the United States, Klaus Scharioth, at the German Embassy in Washington, D.C. The cross is Germany's highest civilian award.

Selected publications
The Kishinev Ghetto, 1941-1942: A documentary history of the Holocaust in Romania's contested borderlands. University of Alabama Press, 2015.

See also
Martin C. Dean

References 

21st-century American historians
21st-century American male writers
Living people
Year of birth missing (living people)
Historians of the Holocaust
Recipients of the Cross of the Order of Merit of the Federal Republic of Germany
United States Holocaust Memorial Museum
American male non-fiction writers